Discogobio macrophysallidos is a fish species in the genus Discogobio endemic to China.

References

External links 

Cyprinid fish of Asia
Fish described in 1989
Discogobio